Train of Thought is the debut album of American hip hop duo Reflection Eternal, released October 17, 2000 on Rawkus Records. Collaborating as a duo, rapper Talib Kweli and DJ and hip hop producer Hi-Tek recorded the album during 1999 to 2000, following their individual musical work that gained notice in New York's underground scene during the late 1990s. Kweli had previously worked with rapper Mos Def as the duo Black Star, and Hi-Tek had served as producer on the duo's debut album.

Critical reception

Train of Thought was well received by music critics. Chicago Sun-Times writer Kyla Kyles said, "With a flurry of metaphors and below-the-basement underground beats, this train is on the right track. This disc proves that Kweli is a deep-thinking, gifted MC, and Hi Tek is an emerging wax master." AllMusic's Matt Conaway compared Reflection Eternal's music to the work of the Native Tongues collective, while writing that the album "houses enough merit to establish Talib as one of this generation's most poetic MCs". PopMatters writer Dave Heaton described Talib Kweli as "a hyper-articulate MC with a revolutionary's mind and a sensitive poet's heart, but he's also a world-class battle MC, able to rip other MCs' rhymes apart in a quick second". Kathryn Farr of Rolling Stone called Train of Thought "the rare socially aware hip-hop record that can get fists pumping in a rowdy nightclub".

Pitchfork critic Sam Eccleston wrote of Kweli's boastful lyrics, "Kweli uses the rhythm as a foundation, building rambling, baroque rhyme structures on top of them, exhibiting his cock-eyed 'skills'. This kind of braggadocio doesn't weaken the effort in the same way his moralizing self-canonization does, if only because he can often back those claims up". Noah Callahan-Bever of Vibe shared a similar sentiment, writing "Reflection Eternals great weakness is Kweli's excessive preaching about the state of hip hop, but at least he cares". In The New Rolling Stone Album Guide (2004), Jon Caramanica called it "thick with fierce street raps ('Down for the Count' and 'Ghetto Afterlife'), maudlin soul ('Love Language'), and the type of insightful versifying Kweli has made his stock-in-trade ('Memories Live' and 'This Means You')".

Track listing

Sample credits
Sample information for Train of Thought adapted from TheBreaks.

Move Something
"Shaft's Mama" by Charlie Whitehead
This Means You
"Cloud in My Sunshine" by Redbone
Too Late
"Reverie" by Tomita
"Passepied" by Tomita
Memories Live
"I Can't Stand the Rain" by Ann Peebles
"Carol Ann" by Soft Machine
Ghetto Afterlife
"Tomorrow I May Not Feel the Same" by Gene Chandler
Love Language
"Welcome" by Norman Connors

Love Speakeasy
"Welcome" by Norman Connors
Soul Rebels
"Funky Music" by Patti LaBelle
Eternalists
"Follow the Leader" by Eric B. & Rakim
Big Del from Da Natti
"Divided Reality" by Bo Hansson
Good Mourning
"Dizzy" by Hugo Montenegro
"C.R.E.A.M." by Wu-Tang Clan

Personnel

Rick James - Producer
Hi-Tek - Producer, Engineer, Executive Producer, Mixing
Weldon Irvine - Keyboards, Producer
Tracie - Background Vocals
Owen Brown - Fiddle
De La Soul - Performer
Derrick Gardner - Trumpet
Troy Hightower - Engineer, Mixing
Kool G Rap - Performer
Guy Snider - Engineer
Teodross Avery - Saxophone
Ken Ifill - Mixing
Vinia Mojica - Vocals
Les Nubians - Performer
Xzibit - Performer
Steve Souder - Mixing
Chris Athens - Mastering
Mos Def - Performer
Talib Kweli - Vocals, Producer, Executive Producer
Monique Walker - Background Vocals

Carlisle Young - Mixing
Rah Digga - Performer
Asi - Design, Layout Design
Rikki Stein - Liner Notes
Bassi Kolo Percussion Group - Percussion
Big Del - Background Vocals
Crossfader Chris - Cutting Engineer
Dave Dar - Engineer, Mixing
Darcel - Background Vocals
Donte - Background Vocals
Katushia - Background Vocals
Jerome Lagarrigue - Illustrations, Cover Illustration
Little Tone - Background Vocals
Neb Luv - Background Vocals
Nonye - Vocals
Tiye Phoenix - Vocals, Background Vocals
Kendra Ross - Vocals, Background Vocals
Imani Uzuri - Background Vocals, Vocal Arrangement
Tiyi Willingham - Background Vocals
Willo - Design, Layout Design

Album singles

Chart history
Album

Singles

Notes

References

External links
 Reflection Eternal: Train of Thought at Discogs
 Album Review at RapReviews

2000 debut albums
Talib Kweli albums
Hi-Tek albums
Rawkus Records albums
Albums produced by Hi-Tek
Albums recorded at Electric Lady Studios